Al filo de la Ley is a 2015 Peruvian buddy cop action film directed by Hugo Flores and Juan Carlos Flores in their directorial debut. Starring Julián Legaspi and Renato Rossini (who co-wrote the script with the Flores brothers). It premiered on July 9, 2015 in Peruvian theaters.

Synopsis 
They betrayed the mafia, they changed their identities to change their lives, today after 20 years they return to the side of the police, as infiltrators in a narco-terrorist mafia.

Cast 
The actors participating in this film are:

 Julián Legaspi as Mauro
 Renato Rossini as "Gringo"
 Milett Figueroa
 Reynaldo Arenas
 Fernando Vasquez
 Rómulo Assereto
 Karen Dejo
 Fiorella Flores
 Xoana Gonzales
 Katy Jara as Evelyn Ortiz
 Rubén Martorell
 Carlos Montalvo
 Juan Manuel Ochoa
 Miriam Saavedra as Stripper

Reception 
The film was seen by 16,387 spectators on its first day in theaters, becoming the second most watched Peruvian film on its first day of release for a while. The film attracted 168,720 viewers throughout its run through Peruvian theaters, becoming the sixth highest-grossing domestic release of the year.

Sequel 
After the success of the first part, it is confirmed that a sequel called Al filo de la ley 2 would be made, which would be shot in Colombia and the United States. This time it will be directed by Renato Rossini as well as featuring performances by Leslie Stewart, Jamila Dahabreh, Gerardo Zamora, Miguel Vergara, Mauricio Diez Canseco and Lisandra Lizama. Its premiere is scheduled for September 21, 2023 in Peruvian theaters.

References

External links 

 

2015 films
2015 action films
Peruvian buddy cop films
Peruvian action films
2010s Spanish-language films
2010s Peruvian films
Films set in Peru
Films shot in Peru
2015 directorial debut films